"Here You Come Again" is a song written by Barry Mann and Cynthia Weil, and recorded by American entertainer Dolly Parton. It was released as a single in September 1977 as the title track from Parton's album of the same name, topped the U.S. country singles chart for five weeks, and won the 1978 Grammy award for Best Female Country Vocal Performance; it also reached number three on the U.S. Billboard Hot 100, representing Parton's first significant pop crossover hit.

Composition and recording
The song was composed by Mann and Weil, and it was a rare example of a Parton hit that she did not write herself. The songwriting duo originally composed "Here You Come Again" in 1975 as a potential comeback hit for Brenda Lee, but when Lee decided not to record it, the song made its way to Parton, who was looking for something to broaden her appeal. Her producer, Gary Klein, who had heard the song on B.J. Thomas's recently released self-titled album, reported that Parton had begged him to add a steel guitar to avoid sounding too pop, and he called in Al Perkins to fill that role. "She wanted people to be able to hear the steel guitar, so if someone said it isn't country, she could say it and prove it," Klein told journalist Tom Roland. "She was so relieved. It was like her life sentence was reprieved."

The song modulates keys four times. The first two verses are set in G major, followed by A major for the first bridge, G major for the third verse, B major for the second bridge, and finally A major for the last verse and outro.  The song moves at a swinging tempo of 106 beats per minute in common time, with Parton's vocals ranging from G3 to D5.

Critical reception
"Here You Come Again" was the centerpiece of Parton's pop crossover in the late 1970s. The single spent five weeks at the top of the U.S Billboard country charts and reached number three on the U.S. Billboard Hot 100. It earned Parton the award for "Best Female Country Vocal Performance" at the Grammy Awards.  The song has sold 271,000 digital copies in the United States as of February 2019 since becoming available for digital download.

Chart performance

Weekly charts

Year-end charts

Certifications

Covers and other versions
B.J. Thomas recorded the song for his self-titled 1977 album. This version was released before Parton's.
Randy Bishop recorded the song in 1976, released as a single in June 1977 on A&M Records.
Patti LaBelle recorded the song for her 1981 “The Spirit’s In It” album.
Kikki Danielsson covered the song on her 1981 album Just Like a Woman, with lyrics written by herself in Swedish as Här är jag igen (translated: "Here I am again"). It remains one of the few times the singer Kikki Danielsson was self-involved in songwriting.
In 2014, this song was covered by Katy Perry and Kacey Musgraves on a June 13, 2014 episode of CMT Crossroads. They also performed it on 2019 MusiCares Person of the Year event honoring Dolly Parton on February 8, 2019 and during the tribute performance for Parton on the 61st Annual Grammy Awards two days later.

References

External links
Here You Come Again lyrics at Dolly Parton On-Line
 

1977 singles
B. J. Thomas songs
Dolly Parton songs
Millie Jackson songs
Kikki Danielsson songs
Patti LaBelle songs
Maureen McGovern songs
Clay Aiken songs
Jill Johnson songs
Songs written by Barry Mann
RCA Records singles
Songs with lyrics by Cynthia Weil
1977 songs
Song recordings produced by Gary Klein (producer)